Egon Malte Larsson (30 October 1914 – 7 February 1989) was a Swedish singer, actor, dancer, director, choreographer, composer and writer. Larsson appeared in about 15 films between 1943 and 1958 and choreographed dance numbers in seven films.

Selected filmography
 Det spökar - det spökar ... (1943)
 Gröna hissen (1944)
 Flottans kavaljerer (1948)
 Life at Forsbyholm Manor (1948)
 Södrans revy (1950)
 Två sköna juveler (1954)
 Flottans glada gossar (1954)
 Dance on Roses (1954)
 Flicka i kasern (1955)
 Foreign Intrigue (1955) (TV series)
 Sista natten (1956)
 The Koster Waltz (1958)

References

External links

1914 births
1989 deaths
Swedish male film actors
20th-century Swedish male actors